Goodbye and Hello may refer to:

Goodbye and Hello (Tim Buckley album), 1967
Goodbye & Hello (Tanya Chua album), 2007

See also
Hello and Goodbye (disambiguation)
Hello Goodbye (disambiguation)